Bobby Ramirez, (September 26, 1969 – July 18, 2016), professionally known by his stage name DTTX (short for 'Don't Try To Xerox'), was an American rapper, best known for being a member of the Latin hip hop duo Lighter Shade of Brown.

Career 
Ramirez was born on September 26, 1969 in Hanford, California to parents of Mexican descent. In 1989, Ramirez and Robert "ODM" Gutierrez formed the hip hop group A Lighter Shade of Brown in Riverside. From 1990, the duo has released five studio albums before they went on hiatus in 1999. In 2010, the duo returned to performing and released their sixth album in 2011. DTTX has released four solo albums from 2001 to 2006, and appeared on the soundtrack to the 1996 film Bulletproof.

Death 
DTTX was discovered on July 7, 2016 unresponsive in a Las Vegas street, with severe burns all over his body and a temperature of 107°F degrees. Ramirez was rushed to the hospital were he would be in a coma for 11 days before passing away at Sunrise Hospital & Medical Center on Monday July 18, 2016 at 2:20pm at the age of 46. According to the Clark County coroner, Ramirez died from heatstroke, with exposure as a contributing factor.

Discography

Studio albums
 Back 2 Da Brown (2001)
 Luv'n the Life (2005)
 Still Brown & Proud (2006)
 Sitting in the Park (2006)

with A Lighter Shade of Brown
 Brown & Proud (1990)
 Hip Hop Locos (1992)
 Layin' in the Cut (1994)
 Lighter Shade of Brown (1997)
 If You Could See Inside Me (1999)
 It's a Wrap (2011)

References

External links 
DTTX at AllMusic
DTTX at Discogs

1969 births
2016 deaths
American rappers of Mexican descent
People from Riverside, California
West Coast hip hop musicians
Rappers from California
Hispanic and Latino American rappers